Erneido Andres Oliva Gonzalez (June 20, 1932 – January 30, 2020) was a Cuban-American who was the deputy commander of Brigade 2506 land forces in the abortive Bay of Pigs Invasion of Cuba in April 1961.

Biography 
In 1954 Oliva was commissioned as a second lieutenant in the Cuban Army after graduating from the Cuban Military Academy, "the Cadet School." After graduating with honors from the Artillery Academy in 1955 he was appointed professor of Artillery in the Cadet School until 1958. From 1958 to 1959 he was a student, also graduating with honors, and an instructor at the US Army Caribbean School in the Canal Zone, Panama. In late 1959 after the Castro revolution overthrew General Batista, the Cuban army was "purged", but Oliva was appointed General Inspector at the INRA. In May 1960 he was one of a group of former Cuban officers planning a campaign against the Castro regime. They were all graduates of Cuba's military academy. He left the army early in August 1960 and flew to Miami. On August 29, 1960, Oliva and about 40 young Cuban exiles, recruited by the Central Intelligence Agency were transported via CIA C-54 aircraft to San José, Guatemala to perform guerrilla training that later became conventional.

Oliva was appointed deputy commander of Brigade 2506, the assault brigade of Cuban exiles, that landed at the Bay of Pigs on April 17, 1961, under the command of Jose (Pepe) San Roman. San Roman landed at Playa Giron and Oliva, commanding a brigade task force, established a beachhead at Playa Larga about 20 miles east of Giron. After the Brigade had ceased fighting on April 19, 1961, due to lack of air support promised by the Kennedy administration, Oliva organized all the Brigade's men that were withdrawing to Playa Giron and, with men of the 2nd and 6th battalions, tried to reach the Escambray mountains. However, Castro's air attacks forced the Brigadistas to scatter into the woods and swamps near Girón. He was captured by Cuban militia on April 23, 1961. He was released from prison and flown to Miami on December 24, 1962, after the U.S. Government paid a ransom of $500,000 for each of the three leaders of the Brigade.

On December 29, 1962, Oliva was on stage next to the US President, John F. Kennedy, at the Orange Bowl in Miami, during the 'welcome back' ceremony for ransomed Brigade 2506 veterans and he addressed the veterans. On behalf of the members of the Brigade, 1,500 of whom were in formation at the stadium, he presented the Brigade flag to the President who said: "Commander I assure you that this flag will be returned to this Brigade in a free Havana." Since his arrival in the United States, Oliva developed a close relationship with U.S. Attorney General Robert F. Kennedy. Bobby Kennedy involved him in the Cuban Project (Operation Mongoose), a White House-organized counterrevolutionary unit led by Manuel Artime based in Costa Rica and Nicaragua that staged commando raids on Cuban shore installations. In March 1963 Oliva was commissioned in the US Army as a second lieutenant and was appointed by President Kennedy to represent Cuban-American personnel serving throughout the US armed forces. In 1965, he was promoted to Captain at the Pentagon by Cyrus Vance, then Secretary of Defense. The Special Army Training for the officers of Brigade 2506 was terminated by President Johnson two months after the assassination of President Kennedy. At the White House in February 1964, in the presence of the then Attorney General, Robert Kennedy, President Johnson informed Oliva of his decision to end all Cuban anti-Castro projects sponsored by the government including the one led by Oliva in the U.S. Army.

Oliva underwent infantry training at Fort Benning, Georgia, and artillery training at Fort Sill, Oklahoma. He participated in the U.S. intervention of the Dominican Republic where he served over a year. In 1969, he requested to be transferred to the US Army Reserve. In 1970, he joined the District of Columbia National Guard as a  major. In August 1984, Oliva was promoted to brigadier general of the line in the US Army Reserve and commanded a Military Police Brigade. He earned a master's degree in International Affairs from the American University, Washington, DC and attended the Program for Senior Executives in National and International Security at Harvard University. In July 1987, US President Ronald Reagan, appointed him to the position of deputy commanding general of the D.C. Army National Guard. In December 1992, he was promoted to major general in the District of Columbia Army National Guard. Since retirement on January 1, 1993, Oliva has remained active in the anti-Castro effort, though largely steering clear of exile politics. In 1996, he founded the private Cuban-American Military Council (CAMCO), to promote cooperation between all Cuban military veterans, whether members of the Brigade 2506, the US Army or the Cuban army under Batista or Castro. Oliva has been a member of all four. In January 2008, he was honored with the Heritage Award, a nationally recognized award of Heroes and Heritage which was presented to him by the Vice-Chairman of the Joint Chiefs of Staff. He was later appointed by President George W. Bush to serve as a member of the Board of Governors of the United States Organizations, Incorporated (USO) for a three-year term. Oliva lived with his wife, Graciela Ana Portela Avila, in the Washington Metropolitan Area. They had a daughter and a son and two grandsons.

Awards and decorations

Notes

References
Johnson, Haynes. 1964. The Bay of Pigs: The Leaders' Story of Brigade 2506. W.W. Norton & Co Inc. New York. 
Lynch, Grayston L. 1998. Decision for Disaster: Betrayal at the Bay of Pigs. Bassey's. Washington. 
Rodriguez, Juan Carlos. 1999. Bay of Pigs and the CIA. Ocean Press Melbourne. 
Wyden, Peter. 1979. Bay of Pigs – The Untold Story. Simon and Schuster. New York.   

1932 births
2020 deaths
American people of Cuban descent
Cuban soldiers
United States Army generals
20th-century American military personnel
Prisoners and detainees of Cuba